Battleship Island is an island in the City and Borough of Juneau, Alaska, United States. The name was reported in a 1957 publication by R. N. DeArmond.

The Federal Aviation Administration erected a low level windshear alert system tower on the island in order to assist incoming pilots to Juneau International Airport. Battleship Island is a part of the Channel Islands State Marine Park; it is used for picnicking and camping.

Geographical location 
Battleship Island is an island in the Borough of Juneau in Alaska. The name was reported in a 1957 publication by R. N. DeArmond. It was collected by the United States Geological Survey between 1976 and 1981, and entered into the Geographic Names Information System on March 31, 1981.

Location in relation to other towns 

Official status
The Federal Aviation Administration erected a low level windshear alert system tower on the island in order to assist incoming pilots to Juneau International Airport. Battleship Island is a part of the Channel Islands State Marine Park; it is used for picnicking and camping.

References

Citations 

Islands of the Alexander Archipelago
Islands of Juneau, Alaska
Islands of Alaska